Kelly Stefanyshyn (born July 6, 1982) is a Canadian competitive swimmer and backstroke specialist who represented her native country at the 2000 Summer Olympics in Sydney, Australia.  Stefanyshyn was a member of Canada's sixth-place team in the women's 4x100-metre medley relay.  Individually, she also finished eighth in the women's 200-metre backstroke, and competed in the semifinals of the 100-metre backstroke.

Stefanyshyn was previously a three-medal-winner at the 1999 Pan American Games in Winnipeg.  She won a gold medal in the 100-metre backstroke, a silver in the 4x100-metre medley relay, and a bronze in the 200-metre backstroke.

She attended the University of British Columbia, where she was a member of the UBC Thunderbirds swimming and diving team in CIS competition from 2001 to 2004.

See also
 List of Commonwealth Games medallists in swimming (women)

References

External links
 Kelly Stefanyshyn at Swimming Canada
 
 
 
 
 

1982 births
Living people
Canadian female backstroke swimmers
Canadian people of Ukrainian descent
Medalists at the FINA World Swimming Championships (25 m)
Olympic swimmers of Canada
Swimmers from Winnipeg
Swimmers at the 1999 Pan American Games
Swimmers at the 2000 Summer Olympics
Swimmers at the 2006 Commonwealth Games
UBC Thunderbirds swimmers
Commonwealth Games silver medallists for Canada
Pan American Games gold medalists for Canada
Pan American Games silver medalists for Canada
Pan American Games bronze medalists for Canada
Swimmers at the 1998 Commonwealth Games
Commonwealth Games medallists in swimming
Pan American Games medalists in swimming
Universiade medalists in swimming
Universiade bronze medalists for Canada
Medalists at the 2007 Summer Universiade
Medalists at the 1999 Pan American Games
Medallists at the 1998 Commonwealth Games
Medallists at the 2006 Commonwealth Games